C. Sheldon Roberts (October 27, 1926 – June 6, 2014) was an American semiconductor pioneer, and member of the "traitorous eight" who founded Silicon Valley.

Biography
Roberts earned a Bachelor's degree in metallurgical engineering from Rensselaer Polytechnic Institute in 1948, and a Master's degree in 1949 and Ph.D. in 1952, from MIT.

He then worked in research at the Naval Research Lab and the Dow Chemical Company.

He joined the seminal Shockley Semiconductor Laboratory division of Beckman Instruments in Mountain View, California, but left the company along with other members of the traitorous eight with the backing of Sherman Fairchild to form the influential Fairchild Semiconductor corporation.

He later founded Amelco (known now as Teledyne) with traitorous eight alumni Jean Hoerni and Jay Last.

References

External links

The Fairchild Chronicles
Profile at Rensselaer
Rensselaer Alumni Hall of Fame profile

1926 births
2014 deaths
American metallurgists
Rensselaer Polytechnic Institute alumni
Massachusetts Institute of Technology alumni
Silicon Valley people
Dow Chemical Company employees
Scientists at Shockley Semiconductor Laboratory